Summer Villa and McKay–Salmon House is a historic plantation complex and national historic district located near Lillington, Harnett County, North Carolina. It encompasses seven contributing buildings on a rural farm complex.  Summer Villa was built about 1849, and is a two-story, five bay, Greek Revival style dwelling updated in the early 20th century Classical Revival style. It features a central, two-story pedimented portico supported by monumental Doric order columns with a one-story wraparound porch. The outbuildings associated with Summer Villa include the "Playhouse", carriage house (c. 1850), corn crib and three outbuildings. The McKay–Salmon House built in the last quarter of the 19th century and is a one-story decorated frame cottage.

It was listed on the National Register of Historic Places in 1985.

References

Plantation houses in North Carolina
Houses on the National Register of Historic Places in North Carolina
Farms on the National Register of Historic Places in North Carolina
Historic districts on the National Register of Historic Places in North Carolina
Greek Revival houses in North Carolina
Neoclassical architecture in North Carolina
Houses completed in 1849
Buildings and structures in Harnett County, North Carolina
National Register of Historic Places in Harnett County, North Carolina
1849 establishments in North Carolina